The 1860 Missouri gubernatorial election was held on August 6, 1860, and resulted in a victory for the Democratic nominee, Claiborne Fox Jackson.  Jackson defeated the nominee of the Constitutional Union Party, Semple Orr, and Southern "Brekenridge" Democrat Former Gov. Hancock Lee Jackson to become the fifteenth governor of Missouri. Republican James B. Gardenhire also ran in the election, but received a negligible number of votes.

Before the next election in 1864, three men would serve as Governor of Missouri: first, Claiborne Fox Jackson until his defection to the Confederacy in July 1861, then Hamilton Rowan Gamble until his death in January 1864, and finally Lt. Gov Willard Preble Hall.

Results

References

Missouri
1860
Gubernatorial
August 1860 events